7 Year Bitch was an American punk rock band from Seattle, Washington. The band was active between 1990 and 1997 and released three albums over that time. The band formed at the same time as the emergence of the riot grrrl sub-genre, which is a subgenre of punk music from the early to mid-1990s that emphasized the role of women in rock music. The Riot Grrrl movement began as a feminist response to the violence and misogyny that became more prominent in punk music in the mid-to-late 1980s, and 7 Year Bitch, an all-female punk band, emerged as part of that sub-genre.

Biography

Career 
7 Year Bitch was formed in 1990 by vocalist Selene Vigil, guitarist Stefanie Sargent, bassist Elizabeth Davis and drummer Valerie Agnew.  Vigil, Sargent, and Agnew had been playing together in the Seattle band Barbie's Dream Car when their bassist left for Europe. They subsequently recruited Davis and renamed their band after the movie The Seven Year Itch, based on a suggestion by their friend Ben London, a member of the fellow Seattle band Alcohol Funnycar.

At their first concert, the band opened for The Gits, who would prove to have a significant influence on their music. In 1991, the band released their first single "Lorna" and signed with C/Z Records. Their first album, Sick 'Em, was released in 1992, but it was overshadowed by Sargent's death on June 27, through passing out on her back after returning home from a party where she had drunk alcohol and taken a small amount of heroin. Following a period grieving and uncertainty, the band decided to continue, recruiting guitarist Roisin Dunne as Sargent's replacement later that year.

In July 1993, Gits' frontwoman and long-time friend of the band Mia Zapata was raped and murdered while walking home late at night. This event, coupled with Sargent's death the previous year, had a profound effect on the group. As a reaction, the band recorded and released their second album ¡Viva Zapata! (1994) in tribute to both of their fallen friends. During this time, Valerie Agnew also became one of the primary organizers and co-founders of the anti-violence and self-defence organisation Home Alive. On April 8, 1994, the band played a benefit show for Rock Against Domestic Violence at the Cameo Theatre on Miami Beach, alongside Babes in Toyland and Jack Off Jill.

In 1995, the band signed with Atlantic Records and in 1996 released their third album, Gato Negro. Following the tour supporting Gato Negro, guitarist Roisin Dunne left, and was replaced by Lisa Faye Beatty, the band's live sound engineer and long-time friend.

Break-up 
In early 1997, the band began recording material for what was to be their fourth album. The band moved from Seattle to California, Elizabeth Davis and Valerie Agnew to San Francisco, and Selene Vigil to Los Angeles. With the recent departure of their guitarist, Roisin Dunne and the geographical separation between bandmates, Seven Year Bitch's career came to a close after a final tour with San Francisco's Lost Goat. The break-up was, fittingly, seven years after their formation, mirroring the popular belief of the "seven-year itch".

Aftermath 
Following the break-up of 7 Year Bitch, bassist Elizabeth Davis joined the San Francisco-based band Clone, with whom she performed until 2003. In 2005, she helped to form the band Von Iva. Guitarist Lisa Faye Beatty became involved with filmography, played for the band Smoochknob, and held a solo act called Elfay. She went on to open show for the band Sleepytime Gorilla Museum. Vocalist Selene Vigil formed a gothic/psychedelic-influenced band by the name of Cistine in 2000. She later released the solo album That Was Then in 2010, followed by Tough Dance in 2017. Roisin Dunne joined the band The Last Goodbye in 2006.

Their songs "The Scratch" and "Icy Blue" were featured in the movie Mad Love with Drew Barrymore and Chris O'Donnell.

Band Members

Final Line-up
 Selene Vigil – vocals (1990–1997)
 Elizabeth Davis – bass (1990–1997)
 Valerie Agnew – drums (1990–1997)
 Lisa Faye Beatty – guitar (1996–1997; died 2011)

Former Members
 Stefanie Sargent – guitar (1990–1992; died 1992)
 Roisin Dunne –  guitar (1992–1996)

Timeline

Discography

Albums 
Sick 'Em (C/Z Records, 1992)
¡Viva Zapata! (C/Z Records, 1994)
Gato Negro (Atlantic Records, 1996)
Live at Moe  (Moe Recordings, 2016)

Singles/EPs 
"Lorna" / "No Fucking War", "You Smell Lonely" (Rathouse/Face The Music Records), (1991; reissued by C/Z Records in 1992)
"Antidisestablishmentarianism EP" (Rugger Bugger Records, 1992)
"7 Year Bitch" / "Thatcher On Acid" "Can We Laugh Now?" / "No Fucking War" (Clawfist Records, 1992)
"7 Year Bitch EP" (C/Z Records, 1992)
"Rock-A-Bye Baby" / "Wide Open Trap" (C/Z Records, 1994)
"Miss Understood" / "Go!" (Man's Ruin, 1996)

Compilation appearances 
 "8-Ball Deluxe" on Kill Rock Stars (CD version, Kill Rock Stars, 1992)
 "Dead Men Don't Rape" on There's A Dyke In The Pit (Outpunk/Harp, 1992)
 "The Scratch" on Power Flush: San Francisco, Seattle & You (Rathouse/Broken Rekids, 1993)
 "Dead Men Don't Rape" on Progression (Progression, 1994) [As Seven Year Bitch]
 "The Scratch," "Icy Blue" on the Mad Love Motion Picture Soundtrack (Zoo, 1995)
 "Kiss My Ass Goodbye" on Seattle Women In Rock: A Diverse Collection (Insight, 1995)
 "Damn Good And Well" on Space Mountain (Rough Trade Publishing, 1995)
 "M.I.A." on Notes From The Underground, Vol. 2 (Priority, 1995)
 "24,900 Miles An Hour" on Core (Volume One) (WEA, 1996)
 "24,900 Mile An Hour" on Madhouse Archives Secretos (Warner Music Argentina/WEA/Madhouse, 1996)
 "The History Of My Future" on Sperminator (AWA, 1996)
 "24,900 Miles An Hour" on hu H 23 (Huh Music Service, 1996)
 "Mad Dash" on Home Alive: The Art Of Self-Defense (Epic, 1996)
 "Knot (Live)" on Hype! The Motion Picture Soundtrack (Sub Pop, 1996)
 "Damn Good And Well" on Rough Cuts: The Best Of Rough Trade Publishing, 1991–1995 (Rough Trade Publishing, 1997)
 "Rock-A-Bye Baby" on She's A Rebel (Beloved/Shanachie, 1997)
 "Shake Appeal" on We Will Fall: The Iggy Pop Tribute (Royalty, 1997)
 "M.I.A." on Whatever: The 90's Pop & Culture Box (Flying Rhino/WEA, 2005)
 "The Scratch" on Sleepless In Seattle: The Birth Of Grunge (LiveWire Recordings, 2006)
 "8 Ball Deluxe" on Kill Rock Stars/Stars Kill Rock/Rock Stars Kill (Kill Rock Stars, 2013)
 "Chow Down" on Teen Spirit (Mojo Presents 15 Noise -Filled Classics From The American Underground Scene 1989-1992 (Mojo Magazine, 2017)

Music videos 
"In Lust You Trust" (1992)
"Hip Like Junk" (1994)
"24,900 Miles Per Hour" (1996)
"In Lust Up Trust", Hip Like Junk" - 3 Years Ago Today VHS (C/Z, 1998) [various artist compilation]

References

External links 

http://www.7yearbitchrocks.com  - Official website

Photos of 7 Year Bitch panx.net
7 Year Bitch at the BBC bbc.co.uk

C/Z Records artists
Atlantic Records artists
All-female punk bands
Grunge musical groups
Musical groups established in 1990
Musical groups disestablished in 1997
Musical groups from Seattle
Feminist musicians
Riot grrrl bands
1990 establishments in Washington (state)